A missing heir is a person related to a decedent (dead person), or testator of a will, but whose residence, domicile, Post office, or other address is not known.  A missing heir may be an orphan or other person under a disability, who may need a guardian or custodian of funds.

Missing heirs often come up in the context of legal actions involving wills, title to real property, or a quiet title action.  A private investigator, probate research firm or forensic genealogist may be hired by the executor, trustee, or administrator to find the missing heirs.

A probate court or surrogate judge may require the service of a citation, notice of petition, summons, or subpoena to the relevant persons who may be missing persons, or may know the whereabouts of such person.

Some courts, such as Suffolk County Probate Court in Boston, actively solicit missing heirs.

Probate research companies specialize in locating missing and unknown heirs.

See also
Probate research

References

Inheritance